Slow photography is a term describing a tendency in contemporary photography and arts. In response to the spread of digital photography and the snapshot, artists and photographers retake manual techniques and working methods to work slower, manually and in constant dialogue with the physical materials of the images. It may also refer to continued documentation after the main event has occurred. 

The concept was discussed in detail by David Campany in 2003, in his essay Safety in Numbness: Some remarks on the problems of ‘Late Photography’ Campany uses several terms to explain the concept, "cool" "slow" "late" are all used. Campany opts for the latter suggesting it is a type of photography that is undertaken after the main event has happened.

The term appeared in a 2011 Slate.com piece by journalist Tim Wu, though it may have been used elsewhere as well.  It was also used by Norwegian photographer, artist and photo educator Johanne Seines Svendsen in the article "The Slow Photography – In Motion", published in the book Through a Glass, Darkly in January 2013 in collaboration with the North Norwegian Art Center, The Arts Council of Norway and the Norwegian Photographical Fund. 

Among other exhibits, "The Slow Photography" at The 67th North Norwegian Art Exhibition, first opened in the city of Bodø in January 2013. The installation contained five original ambrotypes and alumitypes presented in a monter; and presents contemporary work with the historical photographical process wet plate collodion (1851–80). 

Slow photography can be seen in the context of cultural, political and environmental tendencies and associated with other elements of the slow movement.

See also
Slow movement
Slow food
Slow architecture
CittaSlow (slow cities)

References

Other sources
"The Slow Photography – In Motion", Johanne Seines Svendsen, 2013
Through a Glass, Darkly, Johanne Seines Svendsen, FingerPrint, 2013. 
The 67th North Norwegian Art Exhibition

External links

SlowPhotography.com
A Slow Photography Movement. 75 writings by Jim Austin Jimages MA (culture)

Photography by genre